Absolute space and time is a concept in physics and philosophy about the properties of the universe. In physics, absolute space and time may be a preferred frame.

Before Newton
A version of the concept of absolute space (in the sense of a preferred frame) can be seen in Aristotelian physics. Robert S. Westman writes that a "whiff" of absolute space can be observed in Copernicus's De revolutionibus orbium coelestium, where Copernicus uses the concept of an immobile sphere of stars.

Newton
Originally introduced by Sir Isaac Newton in Philosophiæ Naturalis Principia Mathematica, the concepts of absolute time and space provided a theoretical foundation that facilitated Newtonian mechanics. According to Newton, absolute time and space respectively are independent aspects of objective reality:

Absolute, true and mathematical time, of itself, and from its own nature flows equably without regard to anything external, and by another name is called duration: relative, apparent and common time, is some sensible and external (whether accurate or unequable) measure of duration by the means of motion, which is commonly used instead of true time ...

According to Newton, absolute time exists independently of any perceiver and progresses at a consistent pace throughout the universe. Unlike relative time, Newton believed absolute time was imperceptible and could only be understood mathematically. According to Newton, humans are only capable of perceiving relative time, which is a measurement of perceivable objects in motion (like the Moon or Sun). From these movements, we infer the passage of time.

These notions imply that absolute space and time do not depend upon physical events, but are a backdrop or stage setting within which physical phenomena occur. Thus, every object has an absolute state of motion relative to absolute space, so that an object must be either in a state of absolute rest, or moving at some absolute speed. To support his views, Newton provided some empirical examples: according to Newton, a solitary rotating sphere can be inferred to rotate about its axis relative to absolute space by observing the bulging of its equator, and a solitary pair of spheres tied by a rope can be inferred to be in absolute rotation about their center of gravity (barycenter) by observing the tension in the rope.

Differing views

Historically, there have been differing views on the concept of absolute space and time. Gottfried Leibniz was of the opinion that space made no sense except as the relative location of bodies, and time made no sense except as the relative movement of bodies. George Berkeley suggested that, lacking any point of reference, a sphere in an otherwise empty universe could not be conceived to rotate, and a pair of spheres could be conceived to rotate relative to one another, but not to rotate about their center of gravity, an example later raised by Albert Einstein in his development of general relativity.

A more recent form of these objections was made by Ernst Mach. Mach's principle proposes that mechanics is entirely about relative motion of bodies and, in particular, mass is an expression of such relative motion. So, for example, a single particle in a universe with no other bodies would have zero mass. According to Mach, Newton's examples simply illustrate relative rotation of spheres and the bulk of the universe.

When, accordingly, we say that a body preserves unchanged its direction and velocity in space, our assertion is nothing more or less than an abbreviated reference to the entire universe.—Ernst Mach; as quoted by Ciufolini and Wheeler: Gravitation and Inertia, p. 387

These views opposing absolute space and time may be seen from a modern stance as an attempt to introduce operational definitions for space and time, a perspective made explicit in the special theory of relativity.

Even within the context of Newtonian mechanics, the modern view is that absolute space is unnecessary. Instead, the notion of inertial frame of reference has taken precedence, that is, a preferred set of frames of reference that move uniformly with respect to one another. The laws of physics transform from one inertial frame to another according to Galilean relativity, leading to the following objections to absolute space, as outlined by Milutin Blagojević:

 The existence of absolute space contradicts the internal logic of classical mechanics since, according to Galilean principle of relativity, none of the inertial frames can be singled out.
 Absolute space does not explain inertial forces since they are related to acceleration with respect to any one of the inertial frames.
 Absolute space acts on physical objects by inducing their resistance to acceleration but it cannot be acted upon.

Newton himself recognized the role of inertial frames.

The motions of bodies included in a given space are the same among themselves, whether that space is at rest or moves uniformly forward in a straight line.

As a practical matter, inertial frames often are taken as frames moving uniformly with respect to the fixed stars. See Inertial frame of reference for more discussion on this.

Mathematical definitions

Space, as understood in Newtonian mechanics, is three-dimensional and Euclidean, with a fixed orientation. It is denoted E3. If some point O in E3 is fixed and defined as an origin, the position of any point P in E3 is uniquely determined by its radius vector  (the origin of this vector coincides with the point O and its end coincides with the point P). The three-dimensional linear vector space R3 is a set of all radius vectors. The space R3 is endowed with a scalar product ⟨ , ⟩.

Time is a scalar which is the same in all space E3 and is denoted as t. The ordered set { t } is called a time axis.

Motion (also path or trajectory) is a function r : Δ → R3 that maps a point in the interval Δ from the time axis to a position (radius vector) in R3.

The above four concepts are the "well-known" objects mentioned by Isaac Newton in his Principia:
I do not define time, space, place and motion, as being well known to all.

Special relativity
The concepts of space and time were separate in physical theory prior to the advent of special relativity theory, which connected the two and showed both to be dependent upon the reference frame's motion. In Einstein's theories, the ideas of absolute time and space were superseded by the notion of spacetime in special relativity, and curved spacetime in general relativity.

Absolute simultaneity refers to the concurrence of events in time at different locations in space in a manner agreed upon in all frames of reference. The theory of relativity does not have a concept of absolute time because there is a relativity of simultaneity. An event that is simultaneous with another event in one frame of reference may be in the past or future of that event in a different frame of reference, which negates absolute simultaneity.

Einstein

Quoted below from his later papers, Einstein identified the term aether with "properties of space", a terminology that is not widely used. Einstein stated that in general relativity the "aether" is not absolute anymore, as the geodesic and therefore the structure of spacetime depends on the presence of matter.

General relativity
Special relativity eliminates absolute time (although Gödel and others suspect absolute time may be valid for some forms of general relativity) and general relativity further reduces the physical scope of absolute space and time through the concept of geodesics. There appears to be absolute space in relation to the distant stars because the local geodesics eventually channel information from these stars, but it is not necessary to invoke absolute space with respect to any system's physics, as its local geodesics are sufficient to describe its spacetime.

See also

References and notes

Classical mechanics
Theory of relativity
Time in physics
Physical cosmology
Aristotelianism
Philosophy of time
Space and time